Alden Darby, Jr. (born June 22, 1992) is a Canadian football defensive back for the Winnipeg Blue Bombers of the Canadian Football League (CFL). He played college football at Arizona State.

College career
Darby played for the Arizona State Sun Devils from 2010 to 2013.

Professional career

San Diego Chargers
Darby signed with the San Diego Chargers after going undrafted in the 2014 NFL Draft. On August 30, 2014, he was released by the Chargers.

Pittsburgh Steelers
Darby signed with the Pittsburgh Steelers. He was released on September 5, 2015.

New Orleans Saints
Darby signed with the New Orleans Saints. On August 4, 2016, Darby was placed on injured reserve. On August 7, 2016, he was released by the Saints with an injury settlement.

Indianapolis Colts
On August 17, 2016, Darby signed with the Indianapolis Colts. On August 28, 2016, Darby was waived by the Colts, but was re-signed two days later. On September 3, 2016, he was waived by the Colts as part of final roster cuts.

Toronto Argonauts
On July 16, 2017, Darby was signed to the practice roster of the Toronto Argonauts of the Canadian Football League. He played in eight regular season games with the Argonauts in 2017 where he had 18 defensive tackles and one interception that he returned 75 yards for his first career touchdown. He was on the injured list when the team won the 105th Grey Cup. He re-signed with the Argonauts on January 25, 2021.

Winnipeg Blue Bombers
On July 19, 2021, Darby was traded to the Winnipeg Blue Bombers in exchange for offensive lineman Terry Poole. He played in 11 regular season games where he had 34 defensive tackles and was named a CFL West All-Star. He finished the season as a Grey Cup champion as the Blue Bombers won the 108th Grey Cup. He became a free agent upon the expiry of his contract on February 8, 2022.

Hamilton Tiger-Cats
Darby signed with the Hamilton Tiger-Cats as a free agent on February 10, 2022, after initially verbally agreeing to join the Ottawa Redblacks. He played in ten games where he recorded 23 tackles, one sack, and one interception.

Winnipeg Blue Bombers (II)
On October 4, 2022, the day before the trade deadline, Darby was traded to the Winnipeg Blue Bombers in exchange for Cedric Wilcots.

References

External links
Arizona State bio
Winnipeg Blue Bombers bio

1992 births
Living people
African-American players of American football
African-American players of Canadian football
American football defensive backs
Arizona State Sun Devils football players
Canadian football defensive backs
Indianapolis Colts players
New Orleans Saints players
Pittsburgh Steelers players
Players of American football from Long Beach, California
Players of Canadian football from Long Beach, California
San Diego Chargers players
Toronto Argonauts players
Winnipeg Blue Bombers players
Hamilton Tiger-Cats players
21st-century African-American sportspeople